Trochomorpha apia is a species of air-breathing land snail, a terrestrial pulmonate gastropod mollusk in the family Trochomorphidae.

Distribution
This species is endemic to American Samoa and Vanuatu.

References

External links
 Hombron J.B. & Jacquinot H. (1847) (April). Atlas d'Histoire Naturelle. Zoologie par MM. Hombron et Jacquinot, chirurgiens de l'expédition. in: Voyage au pole sud et dans l'Océanie sur les corvettes l'Astrolabe et la Zélée pendant les années 1837-1838-1839-1840 sous le commandement de M. Dumont-D'Urville capitaine de vaisseau publié sous les auspices du département de la marine et sous la direction supérieure de M. Jacquinot, capitaine de Vaisseau, commandant de La Zélée. Livraison 22. Mollusques pls 3, 7
 Baker, H. B. (1941). Zonitid snails from Pacific islands. Part 3 and 4. Bernice P. Bishop Museum Bulletin. 166: 203–370

Trochomorphidae
Gastropods described in 1852
Taxa named by Jacques Bernard Hombron
Taxa named by Honoré Jacquinot
Taxonomy articles created by Polbot